Karl Braun is the name of:
 , German jurist and politician
 Karl Braun (politician, 1822) (1822–1893), German politician and writer
 Karl Ferdinand Braun (1850–1918), German electrical engineer, inventor, physicist, and Nobel laureate

See also  
Carl Braun Camera-Werk, also known as Karl Braun KG